Neolithodes diomedeae is a species of king crab which is found in the eastern Pacific Ocean, the southwestern Atlantic Ocean, and the Bellingshausen and Scotia Seas in the Southern Ocean.

Diet 
Neolithodes diomedeae are opportunistic, necrophagous scavengers. In the Gulf of California's abyssal plain, they live around hydrothermal vents and feed on organic material which falls from the pelagic zone. In deep-sea sedimentary habitats, young N. diomedeae have been found to have a symbiotic relationship with sea cucumbers, frequently situating themselves on or underneath members of the genus Scotoplanes. This relationship is hypothesized to be related to elevated food availability and shelter from predation.

References

External links 

 

King crabs
Crustaceans described in 1894
Crustaceans of the Pacific Ocean
Crabs of the Atlantic Ocean
Fauna of the Southern Ocean
Marine fauna of the Gulf of California